Kevin J. Tracey, a neurosurgeon and inventor, is the president and CEO of the Feinstein Institute for Medical Research, professor of neurosurgery and molecular medicine at Donald and Barbara Zucker School of Medicine at Hofstra/Northwell, and president of the Elmezzi Graduate School of Molecular Medicine in Manhasset, New York. The Public Library of Science Magazine, PLOS Biology, recognized Tracey in 2019 as one of the most cited researchers in the world.

Early life 
Tracey was born in Fort Wayne, Indiana on 10 December 1957. He received his B.S. in chemistry from Boston College in 1979 and his M.D. from Boston University in 1983. From 1983 to 1992 he trained in neurosurgery at the New York Hospital/Cornell University with Russel Patterson. During this time he was also a guest investigator at Rockefeller University.

Academic appointments 
In 1992, Tracey moved to Northwell Health, in Manhasset, New York, where he practiced neurosurgery and established the Laboratory of Biomedical Science (now the Center for Biomedical Science). In 2005 he was appointed president and CEO of the Feinstein Institute for Medical Research, and professor at and president of the Elmezzi Graduate School of Molecular Medicine (Manhasset, New York).

Research 
Tracey studies inflammation; he turned to immunological research and inflammation after training as a neurosurgeon, due to his puzzlement over what happened to an 11-month-old girl in his care who died of sepsis. Training as both a neurosurgeon and immunologist merged in discovery of the mechanism by which neurons control the immune system.

In the early 1980s, Tracey and colleagues described the inflammatory activity of TNF and other cytokines as a cytokine capable of causing shock and tissue injury. Because excessive TNF production damages tissues in the body, it was the basis for the discovery and development of disease-modifying antirheumatic drugs for arthritis and inflammatory bowel disease. A subsequently expanding field of research confirmed that TNF is a mediator of septic shock, but not sepsis. This prompted Tracey to search for other mediators of sepsis, culminating in 1999 by discovering high mobility group box 1 (HMGB1), a protein previously known as a DNA-binding transcription factor, is an inflammatory mediator. The discovery of HMGB1 as a damaged associated molecular pattern (DAMP) offered a mechanism for how sterile injury, which causes HMGB1 release, causes inflammation even in the absence of infection.

In the 1990s an accidental result in the Tracey lab led to a discovery of how the brain normally inhibits the production of TNF. They had developed an anti-inflammatory named CNI-1493, or semapimod. Unexpectedly, the CNI-1493 stimulated the vagus nerve to inhibit TNF production in the body. This discovery that the vagus nerve controls the immune system led him to study the effects of stimulating the vagus nerve with electrodes to alleviate inflammation, called "the inflammatory reflex".

In 2007 he co-founded a company called SetPoint Medical which aimed to develop vagus nerve stimulation devices to treat autoimmune diseases. The company started clinical trials in 2011, and in 2016 published results for treating patients with rheumatoid arthritis. Vagus nerve stimulation has successfully blocked inflammation in clinical trials of rheumatoid arthritis and inflammatory bowel disease.

The Tracey lab mapped the inflammatory reflex using genetic, immunological, and bioelectronic tools to define the molecular and neuroscience mechanisms. An unexpected finding from this work is the vagus nerve, a parasympathetic nerve, controls the splenic nerve, a sympathetic nerve. Additionally in 2011, Tracey and colleagues discovered a memory T cell subset that secretes acetylcholine in the spleen when activated by signals arising in the vagus nerve, named "T ChAt" cells. These regulatory T cells produce acetylcholine, the chemical signal to macrophages which turns off production of TNF and other inflammatory mediators.

In May 2018, Tracey's team was first to decode specific signals that the nervous system uses to communicate immune status and alert the brain to inflammation. Identifying these neural signals and what they're communicating about the body's health provides insight into diagnostic and therapeutic targets, and device development. In February 2019, Tracey along with a team led by Tak Mak, PhD, and Maureen Cox, PhD, reported that T ChAt regulate the development of immunity during virus infections.

In November 2020, they reported that neurons in the brainstem dorsal motor nucleus (DMN) of the vagus nerve transmit signals to the celiac-superior mesenteric ganglia in the abdomen. This experiment combined optogenetics, anatomical and functional mapping, and measurement of TNF production to show for the first time that parasympathetic vagus neurons control sympathetic splenic neurons, because the parasympathetic and sympathetic nervous systems were believed to be independent.

Awards and honors 
Fellow, American Institute for Medical and Biological Engineering, 2020
 Harvey Lecture Series, Harvey Society, 2018
 Fellow, American Association for the Advancement of Science, 2015
 Grenvik lectureship, University of Pittsburgh, 2013
 Member, Association of American Physicians, 2009
 Nancy Bucher lecture, Boston University School of Medicine, 2009
 Honorary doctorate from the Karolinska Institute, 2009
 Highly Cited Researcher in Immunology.
 DeWitt Stetten Jr. lectureship, National Institute of Health, 2007 
 Member, American Society of Clinical Investigation, 2001
 Recognized as one of the most cited researchers, listed among the top 1,000 worldwide, PLOS Biology, The Public Library of Science Magazine

Select publications

Book and editorial activities 
 
 Editor-in-chief, Bioelectronic Medicine
 Advisory Editor, Journal of Experimental Medicine
 Contributing Editor, Molecular Medicine

References

External links
 

1957 births
Living people
American immunologists
American neurosurgeons
Morrissey College of Arts & Sciences alumni
Boston University School of Medicine alumni